Amr Singh is a film director, and creative partner at Fort. He is currently based in Johannesburg, South Africa.

Early life
Amr Singh was born in Cape Town, South Africa on 26 April 1985. He attended the University of Cape Town in 2003 where he graduated with degrees (BA Hons) in media studies, anthropology and film.

Career
While students, Amr Singh and Shukri Toefy founded Fort, where Singh now serves as co-founder, creative partner and film director.

Best known for his music videos and commercials, Singh has since worked with international celebrities, directors and talent, including Nigerian singer-songwriter and musician D'banj, actor, writer, comedian and producer Kevin Hart, director and producer Leslie Small, and Swedish singer-songwriter and music producer Maher Zain, among others.

Unwritten: A Visual Journey of Nepal
In 2014, filming began on Unwritten: A Visual Journey of Nepal, an arthouse short film shot in the Kathmandu Valley, Nepal only months before the Ghorka earthquakes. A film project started with Shukri Toefy under the Rainmakers Journal thought leadership platform, Unwritten is a powerful cinematic account of Toefy's journey across the Kathmandu Valley as told by the pages of his journal. Along his journey he meets with artisans, musicians, spiritualists, scholars, and survivors of a bygone era where the knowledge handed down from generation to generation was seen as a rite of passage, in search of lessons he can apply to his own life.

Unwritten has received critical acclaim in the international film category with Official Selection at Roma Cinema Doc, Largo Film Awards and the 10th Annual Bali International Film Festival, and has won at the 2016 Amsterdam Film Festival and Hollywood International Independent Documentary Awards.

Filmography

Short films
Unwritten: A Visual Journey of Nepal (2016)

Music videos
Maher Zain  – Close to You (2016)
Maher Zain  – The Power (2016)
Da L.E.S – Heaven (2014)
AKA – Congratulate (2014)
Danny K – Brown Eyes (2013)

Television commercials 
South African Airways – Next Beginnings (2016)
Brutal Fruit – Blesser (2016)
Nedbank – Athlete (2016)
Menlyn Park – Beautiful Day (2016)
MTV Base – My Base My Life (2016)
South African Airways – Carrier of Dreams (2015)
YAS Mall – The Race (2015)
Etisalat – Photobook (2014)

Awards and nominations

References

South African film directors
Living people
1985 births